

Bruno Schatz (24 June 1894 – 3 December 1974) as a general in the Wehrmacht of Nazi Germany during World War II who commanded the 122nd Infantry Division. He was a recipient of the Knight's Cross of the Iron Cross.  Schatz surrendered to the Soviet Red Army troops in May 1945 in the Courland Pocket. Convicted as a war criminal in the Soviet Union, he was repatriated to Germany in October 1955.

Awards and decorations

 Knight's Cross of the Iron Cross on 9 December 1944 as Oberst and commander of Grenadier-Regiment 977

References

Citations

Bibliography

 

1894 births
1974 deaths
People from Markneukirchen
People from the Kingdom of Saxony
Major generals of the German Army (Wehrmacht)
Military personnel from Saxony
German Army personnel of World War I
German prisoners of war in World War II held by the Soviet Union
Recipients of the Gold German Cross
Recipients of the Knight's Cross of the Iron Cross
Recipients of the clasp to the Iron Cross, 1st class